Musical Justice is a 1931 Paramount Pictures musical short starring Betty Boop and Rudy Vallée and directed by Aubrey Scotto.

Plot summary 
Musical Justice stars Rudy Vallée as judge and His Connecticut Yankees as jury presiding over the Court of Musical Justice.  The judge hears three separate cases.

The final case is the State vs. Betty Boop, in which the judge tells Betty Boop (Mae Questel) that "she has broken every law of music". Boop's rendition of "Don't Take My Boop-Oop-A-Doop Away" results in a verdict of not guilty.

Cast 
Rudy Vallée as Judge
Victor Young as Judicial Bandleader
Mae Questel as Betty Boop

Soundtrack 
"Don't Take My Boop-Oop-A-Doop Away" music by Sammy Timberg	
Sung by Mae Questel

Production background 
This is one of only two movies to portray a live-action Betty Boop. The other is a 1932 episode of the Paramount series Hollywood on Parade, in which Bonnie Poe portrays Betty Boop.
According to a draft of the script, Betty Boop was originally to be played in Musical Justice by Margie Hines.

External links 

Paramount Pictures short films
1931 musical films
Betty Boop
1931 films
American short films
American black-and-white films
American musical films
1931 short films
1930s English-language films
1930s American films